The Red Buttons Show premiered on the CBS television network On October 14, 1952, and ran for two years on that network, then moved to NBC for the final 1954–55 season.

Red's catch phrase from the show, "Strange things are happening!" entered the national vocabulary briefly in the mid-1950s. The series finished #11 for the 1952–1953 season in the Nielsen ratings and #12 in 1953–1954.

Format
The CBS run of the series featured monologues, dance numbers, and sketches with Red and the other series regulars. The characters played by Red included  the boxer Rocky Buttons, the Kupkekin Kid, the Sad Sack, and  Keeleforven. When the series was canceled by CBS, it moved to NBC which at first kept it as a variety show. When the ratings remained low the program was overhauled and turned into a sitcom with Red playing himself as a TV comic. Phyllis Kirk played his wife, Bobby Sherwood played  the director of Red's program and Paul Lynde the network's vice president.

CBS regulars
Red Buttons
Dorothy Jolliffe
Pat Carroll
Beverly Dennis
Allan Walker
Joe Silver
Betty Ann Grave

NBC regulars
Red Buttons
Phyllis Kirk
Paul Lynde as Mr. Standish
Bobby Sherwood
Nelson Case, announcer

References

External links
The Red Buttons Show at the Internet Movie Database
The Red Buttons Show at Classic TV & Movie Hits
The Red Buttons Show theme song lyrics at Classic Themes

1950s American variety television series
1950s American sitcoms
1952 American television series debuts
1955 American television series endings
American television series revived after cancellation
Black-and-white American television shows
CBS original programming
NBC original programming